Adenomera saci is a species of frog in the family Leptodactylidae. It is endemic to central-western and northern Brazil. Prior to its description by Carvalho and Giaretta in 2013, it was confused with Adenomera martinezi. The specific name saci is Portuguese word for a kind of whistling imp in Brazilian (Tupi) folklore, in allusion to the whistling call of this frog.

Description
Adult males measure  and adult females, based on just one specimen,  in snout–vent length. The snout is pointed in dorsal view and acuminate in lateral view; in males, the snout tip has a weakly to well-developed fleshy ridge. The tympanum and supratympanic fold are present. The finger tips are rounded but not expanded, without webbing or fringing. The toe tips are unexpanded and unflattened; no webbing is present. Dorsal coloration consists of 4–6 symmetrically arranged rows of longitudinal dark-colored spots on dark gray to very dark brown background. Cream-colored vertebral stripe is present. The throat and belly are cream colored, sometimes finely covered with white spots. Males have an internal, subgular vocal sac.

The male advertisement call is a long (72–241 ms) whistle. This call is different from that of the morphologically very similar Adenomera martinezi even to the human ear.

The tadpoles are dorsoventrally compressed. Gosner stage 37 tadpole measures  in total length; the body measures .

Habitat and conservation
Males call within underground chambers or from exposed calling sites, typically
among grassy tufts. This species is mainly active during the night, but in rainy days, males can also be heard during the day.

As of mid-2019, the International Union for Conservation of Nature (IUCN) has not assessed this species. However, Carvalho and Giaretta (2013) suggest that the current conservation status of Adenomera martinezi, "least concern", should apply to Adenomera saci. In contrast, after its redelimitation, they suggest that A. martinezi would qualify as "near threatened".

References

saci
Frogs of South America
Amphibians of Brazil
Endemic fauna of Brazil
Amphibians described in 2013
Taxobox binomials not recognized by IUCN